Paul Holz (27 September 1952 – 11 December 2017) was a German football midfielder.

References

External links
 

1952 births
2017 deaths
German footballers
Bundesliga players
2. Bundesliga players
FC Schalke 04 players
VfL Bochum players
Hannover 96 players
Borussia Dortmund players
1. FC Bocholt players
Place of birth missing
Association football midfielders
People from Bottrop
Sportspeople from Münster (region)
Footballers from North Rhine-Westphalia